The Maya Awards is an annual Thai entertainment awards ceremony presented by Maya Channel Magazine. The awards honor people in the Thai entertainment industry and their achievements in the music, film, television and drama. A selected panel of filmmakers and major film critics, which include directors, actors, and actresses take part in the nomination process and determination of winners. It also includes people's choice categories where nominees are voted upon by people through mobile phones and the magazine's voting coupon.

The first ceremony was held on 9 September 2015.

References

External links 
 

Thai television awards
Thai film awards
Awards established in 2015
2015 establishments in Thailand